Duckunoo or duckanoo, also referred to as tie-a-leaf, blue drawers (draws), dokonon (in French Guiana), and dukunou (in Haiti) is a dessert in Jamaica, Antigua and  Barbuda, Barbados, French Guiana and some other Lesser Antilles. It is a variation on the dish ducana which originated in Africa. The Caribbean cuisine dish is made from batata, sweet potato, coconut, spices and brown sugar, all tied up in a banana leaf.  It is then cooked in boiling water.

Duckanoo is a relatively new name for some that was added to the name "tie a leaf". However, the names vary depending on location in various islands. "Ducana" is the Antiguan/Barbudan as well as some of the smaller Caribbean islands name of this dumpling or dessert.

History
Similar to the Meso American 'dulce de tamale', this was a highly popular indigenous dessert in the Americas. Adapted by the Afro-Caribbean people (who were brought to Antigua and Barbuda as well as other Caribbean Islands in the slave trade), ingredients such as eddoes, okra, dasheen, eggplant, and the bonavista bean are used. 

In Ghana, ducana is dokono, and in the Twi language, Odokono.

Variations
Dukuna is a small pudding made of varying mixtures of grated sweet potatoes, coconut, cornmeal and plantain-flour. (From Akan: doko na sweeten mouth Twi: boiled maize Ga: Adangme dokona).

See also

 Asham
 Ducana
 List of desserts
 List of dumplings

References

External links
 Ducana
 Culture – Antigua history

Antigua and Barbuda cuisine
Barbadian cuisine
Belizean cuisine
Caribbean cuisine
French Guianan cuisine
Haitian cuisine
Jamaican desserts
Desserts